Haseltine is a surname. Notable people with the surname include:

Dan Haseltine (born 1973), American singer
Eric Haseltine (born 1951), American technologist
Florence Pat Haseltine (born 1942), American physician
Herbert Haseltine (1877–1962), Italian-born French/American animalier sculptor
William A. Haseltine (born 1944), American biologist and entrepreneur
William Stanley Haseltine (1835–1900), American painter and draftsman
Mara G. Haseltine (born 1971), American artist and environmental activist

See also
Edward Knox Haseltine House
Haseltine, Missouri
William A. Haseltine House
Heseltine

English-language surnames